The following is a list of widely known trees and shrubs found in Texas. Taxonomic families for the following trees and shrubs are listed in alphabetical order by family.

Ecoregions are denoted by similar vegetation and environmental resources. Trees and shrubs are categorized into each of the ecoregions of Texas (equivalent to the EPA's  Level 3 ecoregions). These categorizations can be generally accepted as a tree planting guide for each region.  However, specific site conditions should be considered for any particular location. Likewise, consult the Texas Tree Planting Guide for recommendations.

Numerous non-native plants have been introduced to Texas in the United States and many of them have become invasive species. Plants that are considered invasive are denote with an (I).

Individual tree populations are experiencing severe decline, due to a loss in habitat and/or pests and disease. The conservation status for each known species is denoted in a separate column.



Gymnosperms

Angiosperms

See also
List of invasive species in Texas

References

External links 
Trees of Texas
Flora of Texas
Texas A&M Forest Service
Forest Atlas of the United States

Texas

Trees